Kolanı (also, Kelany-Turany, Kolany, and Kolany-Turuny) is a village and municipality in the Hajigabul Rayon of Azerbaijan.  It has a population of 1,944.

References 

Populated places in Hajigabul District